Liorhyssus is a genus of scentless plant bugs belonging to the family Rhopalidae, subfamily Rhopalinae.

Species
 Liorhyssus hyalinus (Fabricius, 1794)

References

Dolling W.R., 2004 - Superfamily Coreoidea - Catalogue of the Heteroptera of the Palaearctic Region

External links
 Fauna Europaea
 BioLib

Rhopalini
Pentatomomorpha genera